Glaucostegus, also known as giant guitarfishes, is a genus of large Indo-Pacific rays, with a single species, Glaucostegus cemiculus, in the East Atlantic, and Mediterranean. They were formerly classified in the family Rhinobatidae but are now recognized as a distinct family, Glaucostegidae.

Their upperparts are uniform pale yellowish, brownish or greyish, and the nose is pale.

Species
There are seven recognized species, all of which are classified as critically endangered:

 Glaucostegus cemiculus (Geoffroy St. Hilaire, 1817) (Blackchin guitarfish)
 Glaucostegus granulatus Cuvier, 1829 (Sharpnose guitarfish)
 Glaucostegus halavi Forsskål, 1775 (Halavi guitarfish)
 Glaucostegus obtusus (Müller & Henle, 1841) (Widenose guitarfish)
 Glaucostegus thouin (Anonymous, 1798) (Clubnose guitarfish)
 Glaucostegus typus (E. T. Bennett, 1830) (Giant guitarfish)
 ''Glaucostegus younholeei (Habib & Islam, 2021) (Bangladeshi guitarfish)

References 

Rhinopristiformes
Ray genera
Taxa named by Charles Lucien Bonaparte